Gibeon is a meteorite that fell in prehistoric times in Namibia. It was named after the nearest town: Gibeon.

History
The meteorite was discovered by the Nama people and used by them to make tools and weapons.

In 1836 the English captain J. E. Alexander collected samples of the meteorite in the vicinity of the Fish River and sent them to London. There John Herschel analyzed them and confirmed for the first time the extraterrestrial nature of the material.

Between 1911 and 1913, 33 fragments of the meteorite were collected in the vicinity of Gibeon and brought to the capital Windhoek. In 1975 a public fountain displaying the meteorite fragments was planned. The pieces were removed and stored at Alte Feste, where two of the fragments were stolen. The fountain was erected in Post Street Mall, with two empty pillars for the missing fragments. Since then, two more fragments were removed from the fountain, so that it displays only 29 today.

The collection displayed on the fountain in Windhoek's Central Business District was proclaimed a National Monument (Category: geology) on 15 February 1950. Additionally, all meteorites found in Namibia are automatically protected as National Monuments and must not be removed from where they have been found, nor damaged in any way.

Strewn field
The core of this area is situated near the village of Gibeon in Namibia's Hardap Region. About 100–150 different fragments have been collected over time, and additional pieces are  found occasionally.

Composition and classification

The term Gibeon encompasses the whole meteoritic material fallen from the sky during this fall. This material is classified as iron meteorite belonging to the chemical group IVA.

Gibeon meteorites are composed of an iron-nickel alloy containing significant amounts of cobalt and phosphorus. The crystal structure of this meteorite provides a classic example of fine octahedrite and the Widmanstätten pattern is appreciated for its beauty both by collectors and designers of jewelry.

See also
 Glossary of meteoritics

References

External links 

Gibeon Iron Meteorites: Their Discovery, History and Research

Meteorites found in Namibia
National Monuments of Namibia